The knight of faith is an individual who has placed complete faith in himself and in God and can act freely and independently from the world. The 19th-century Danish philosopher Søren Kierkegaard vicariously discusses the knight of faith in several of his pseudonymic works, with the most in-depth and detailed critique exposited in Fear and Trembling and in Repetition.

Overview
Johannes de Silentio, Kierkegaard's pseudonymous author of Fear and Trembling, argues that the knight of faith is the paradox, is the individual, absolutely nothing but the individual, without connections or pretensions.  The knight of faith is the individual who is able to gracefully embrace life: Kierkegaard put it this way in  Either/Or, "When around one everything has become silent, solemn as a clear, starlit night, when the soul comes to be alone in the whole world, then before one there appears, not an extraordinary human being, but the eternal power itself, then the heavens open, and the I chooses itself or, more correctly, receives itself. Then the personality receives the accolade of knighthood that ennobles it for an eternity." "The knight of faith is the only happy man, the heir to the finite while the knight of resignation is a stranger and an alien."

The three stages 

Kierkegaard recognized three levels of individual existence: The Aesthetic, The Ethical, and The Religious.  In Fear and Trembling, Silentio refers to individuals in each stage as the personal self, the civic self, and the religious self.  Each of these levels of existence envelops those below it: an ethical or religious person can still enjoy life aesthetically. Abraham learned how to keep his finite relationship with his family separate from his infinite relationship with God. He had to overcome the fear of having anxiety over losing something. Each individual experiences anxiety to a different degree and the fear of anxiety in a unique way.

Knight of faith and the knight of infinite resignation 
Kierkegaard's Silentio contrasts the knight of faith with the other two, knight of infinite resignation and the aesthetic realm's "slaves."  Kierkegaard uses the story of a princess and a man who is madly in love with her, but circumstances are that the man will never be able to realize this love in this world.  A person who is in the aesthetic stage would abandon this love, crying out for example, "Such a love is foolishness. The rich brewer's widow is a match fully as good and respectable."  A person who is in the ethical stage would not give up on this love, but would be resigned to the fact that they will never be together in this world.  The knight of infinite resignation may or may not believe that they may be together in another life or in spirit, but what's important is that the knight of infinite resignation gives up on their being together in this world; in this life.

The knight of faith feels what the knight of infinite resignation feels, but with exception that the knight of faith believes that in this world; in this life, they will be together.  The knight of faith would say "I believe nevertheless that I shall get her, in virtue, that is, of the absurd, in virtue of the fact that with God all things are possible."  This double movement is paradoxical because on the one hand it is humanly impossible that they would be together, but on the other hand the knight of faith is willing to believe that they will be together through divine possibility.

Using the example of the man who is in love with the princess, Silentio describes how the movements of the knight of infinite resignation and the knight of faith are executed. These movements are carried out normatively, which require passion. For the knight of infinite resignation, having acknowledged the impossibility of the love between the man and the princess, the love is infinitely renounced in the following manner:

 In the first place, the knight of infinite resignation will have the power to concentrate the whole substance of his life and the meaning of actuality into one single desire. 
 In the next place, the knight will have the power to concentrate the conclusion of all his thinking into one act of consciousness.
 The knight, then, makes the movement. The knight will recollect everything, but this recollection is precisely the pain, and yet in infinite resignation he is reconciled with existence.   
 His love for that princess would become for him the expression of an eternal love, would assume a religious character, would be transfigured into a love of the eternal being, which true enough denied the fulfillment but nevertheless did reconcile him once more in the eternal consciousness of its validity in an eternal form that no actuality can take away from him.
 In infinite resignation there is peace and rest.

The knight of faith does exactly the same as the other knight did, but he makes one more movement, for he says: Nevertheless I have faith that I will get her—that is, by virtue of the absurd, by virtue of the fact that for God all things are possible. The knight of faith can, by virtue of the absurd, get what he desires totally and completely. However, Silentio also comments that "that is over and beyond human powers, that is a marvel."

Abraham and Isaac 
Johannes de Silentio believes that Abraham is one such knight of faith.  In the Book of Genesis, God told Abraham to sacrifice his son Isaac. Abraham dearly loved his son, but although bemoaning this fate, Abraham obeyed this command faithfully.  Just as he was about to commit the act, an angel stopped Abraham and rewarded him with his son and his steadfast faith.  In the same paradoxical act of committing murder, which would humanly kill off his son, Abraham believed, through virtue of the absurd, he would still have his son alive and well. Abraham was willing to risk everything for God. He was willing to act and in his action he received the highest good, his eternal happiness.

But "how" did Abraham act? He walked for 3 days step by step trusting in God. That is an example of keeping expectancy alive when any ethicist would say it should have died before he left home. What would have happened to his expectancy had he told Sarah? Or Isaac? He would have to explain himself but he couldn't. So he ventured for the truth of what he understood as the highest good. He kept his resolution intact.

Who are knights of faith? 

Silentio personally believes that only two people were ever knights of faith: The Virgin Mary, and Abraham.  It is also possible that Silentio regards Jesus as a knight of faith.  Silentio grants that there may be knights of faith out there that we do not know about, or that there never have been knights of faith. This is because knights of faith exist alone in isolation. Yet Kierkegaard said the following in Repetition. "The Young Man has gone through the same ordeal as Job but neither of them is a Knight of Faith." Abraham wasn't really alone and living in isolation, he was only alone for three anxiety-filled days, he was a married man who had a wife and children and God had promised him many more. Mary was alone with the angel for a short time but then she was a wife and later a mother. To be sure, Mary bore the child wondrously, but she nevertheless did it “after the manner of women,” and such a time is one of anxiety, distress and paradox. The angel was indeed a ministering spirit, but he was not a meddlesome spirit who went to the other young maidens in Israel and said: Do not scorn Mary, the extraordinary is happening to her. The angel went only to Mary, and no one could understand her. Has any woman been as infringed upon, as Mary, and is it not true here also that the one whom God blesses he curses in the same breath? Fear and Trembling p. 65

The Knight of Faith is a man or woman of action. (See Eighteen Upbuilding Discourses for the kind of action.) Abraham became a Knight of Faith because he voluntarily lifted the knife to sacrifice Isaac. Mary was a Knight of Faith because she volunteered to have Jesus. Jesus became a Knight of Faith because he voluntarily went to the cross. Paul was a Knight of Faith because he voluntarily (resolutely) went to Jerusalem. Kierkegaard considered Diogenes a Knight of Faith also but he didn't have to do great feats or conquer the universe to become one. Kierkegaard stressed the reversal of the inner and the outer in his first book, Either/Or. He may have been thinking that Mary and Joseph, Job, Abraham, Paul, Socrates, and Jesus  all acted in the "innermost being" rather than in the external temporal world at times. However, he made a sharp distinction between Mary and others in his The Book on Adler. Adler had an action in the innermost being but didn't think it was his job to do what he was told but that it was something he should tell the whole church (assembly) to do. An action in the inner-being is something completely different from an action in the outer being. How does one paint an inner action? How does one show an inner action on the stage? How does one describe it to another?

Kierkegaard says, "When the Eleatics denied motion, Diogenes, as everyone knows, came forward as an opponent. He literally did come forward, because he did not say a word but merely paced back and forth a few times, thereby assuming that he had sufficiently refuted them." He used Diogenes in the same way in Philosophical Fragments in 1844. 

Kierkegaard kept to the same theme in his earlier and later works. "The great heroic feats are the stuff of history but they are not the stuff of life. Each single individual can do the great things of life. Each of us is born with the power to become what we become. "[Faith] can be grasped and held fast by the simplest of people, it is only the more difficult for the cultured to attain. What a wondrous, inspiring, Christian humanity: the highest is common for all human beings." He wrote, 

Kierkegaard always points the individual forward just as he did with Abraham. He's always expectant of the good instead of dreading the evil. He trusted God. It's the same with the single individual who has to make a resolution to give some finite thing up and has found that the finite has become of infinite importance. Abraham had faith, and had faith for this life. In fact, if his faith had been only for the life to come, he certainly would have more readily discarded everything in order to rush out of a world to which he did not belong. Fear and Trembling p. 20

Kierkegaard uses this extreme example of the paradox of faith to help people who are afraid to give something up or to take a risk without any certainty of reward. Abraham was willing to risk everything to follow God and Christ was willing to risk everything to teach humanity how to love. Neither of them knew what would come of it. Abraham learned how to love God but did he learn how to love his neighbor and himself?

If I am anxious about a past misfortune, then this is not because it is in the past but because it may be repeated, i.e., become future. If I am anxious because of a past offense, it is because I have not placed it in an essential relation to myself as past and have in some deceitful way prevented it from being past. If indeed it is actually past, then I cannot be anxious but only repentant. If I do not repent, I have allowed myself to make my relation to the offense dialectical, and by this the offense itself has become a possibility, and not something past. If I am anxious about the punishment, it is only because this has been placed in a dialectical relation to the offense (otherwise I suffer my punishment), and then I am anxious for the possible for the future. Thus we have returned to where we were in Chapter I. Anxiety is the psychological state that precedes sin. It approaches sin as closely as possible, as anxiously as possible, but without explaining sin, which breaks forth only in the qualitative leap. Søren Kierkegaard, The Concept of Anxiety, Nichol p. 91-92

Maurice Stanley Friedman compared Kierkegaard and Kafka in his 1963 book Problematic rebel, an image of modern man (p. 386) K. is at times lacking in courage and at other times brazenly impudent, and he is far from "observing every rule of propriety with a glad and confident enthusiasm," like Kierkegaard's "knight of faith." But he does not exalt the Castle "meanly" and, unlike the villagers he dares "to enter those palaces where not merely the memory of the elect abides but . . . the elect themselves." He knows the Angst of Kierkegaard's "knight of faith" who is "born outside the universal" and walks "a solitary path, narrow and steep . . . without meeting a single traveller." Passage after passage in The Castle, indeed, shows K. as essentially a Single One, who has the courage to meet the officials face to face and who is willing to dispense with all the universal patterns and official procedures if he can do so.

Jacques Maritain wrote in 1964, “Soren Kierkegaard was a contemporary of Marx. But it was only at the beginning of the twentieth century that his name began to become famous and his influence to be felt. Neither a philosopher in the strict sense of the word-although nourished in philosophy-and yet a philosopher in the sense of being a lay thinker; nor a theologian nor a prophet (obsessed by his feeling for the requirements of the Gospel and by his own unworthiness, he hardly dared to profess himself a Christian), and yet a kind of prophet and a knight of faith, and, at the end of his life, “a witness to the truth” in his passionate revolt against the established church, this poet of the religious, as he called himself, is a figure complex and ambiguous enough to occupy generations of interpreters and to justify their disagreements.” He also claimed that Theodor Haecker was a knight of faith.

 Kierkegaard used his book Fear and Trembling to make the claim that Abraham, Mary and a tax collector were also knights of faith. These were just common people so faith isn't just for the "chosen few", he says, "Moses struck the rock, but  he did not have faith. … Abraham was God’s chosen one, and it was the Lord who imposed the ordeal.” He says "artists go forward by going backward" by writing about Abraham's faith, Job's faith, Paul's faith and even Christ's faith and by creating imaginary constructions about "heroes" of faith they make Christianity difficult for the simple individual who wants to be a Christian. Yet at the same time churches often make Christianity "a matter of course". Faith just grows by itself, it needs no testing by the individual who wants to have faith, it ends up explained by external functions rather than the internal acknowledgement by the single individual who wants to be a Christian. Artistically faith becomes something impossible to reproduce in actual life. Only the person who is existing can reproduce faith, expectancy, patience, love  and the resolution to hold fast to the expectation no matter what happens in his or her own life to the best of their ability. A person can become a Knight of Faith by acting without certainty. This is what Abraham did in Fear and Trembling and The Young Man failed to do in Repetition. One says, I'll do it because everything within me says I should and the other says I'll do it if everything outside of me says I should. Kierkegaard described the difference well in Either/Or. If one wishes to strip people of their illusions in order to lead them to something more true, here as always you [the esthete] are “at your service in every way.” On the whole you are tireless in tracking down illusions in order to smash them to pieces. You talk so sensibly, with such experience, that anyone who does not know you better must believe that you are a steady man. But you have by no means arrived at what is true. You stopped with destroying the illusion, and since you did it in every conceivable direction, you actually have worked your way into a new illusion-that one can stop with this. Yes, my friend, you are living in an illusion, and you are achieving nothing. Here I have spoken the word that has always had such a strange effect on you. Achieve-“So who is achieving something? That is precisely one of the most dangerous illusions. I do not busy myself in the world at all; I amuse myself the best I can, and I am particularly amused by those people who believe that they are achieving, and is it not indescribably funny that a person believes that? I refuse to burden my life with such grandiose pretensions.” Søren Kierkegaard, Either/Or Part II, Hong, p. 78-79

Biographical
Kierkegaard was raised by parents who were at opposite poles of the spectrum of faith. His father read philosophy and studied with the leaders of the Church of Denmark while his mother couldn't even read. He had learned the terror of belief at an early age. He stood far to the right of the two extremes of the consciousness of sin: those who believe that they sin because Adam sins, so there is no use trying to stop sinning; and those who believe that every sin is like crucifying Christ and possibly commit suicide because they despise themselves so much. One is in danger of being too light-minded about sin, and the other is in danger of being halted or stopped at every moment in fear and trembling. His father taught him the terror of Christianity but his mother showed him the lighter side of the faith. He sought his own balance between the two and he thought his contribution to the discussion about beauty, truth and faith was worth reading. This is how he explained it to himself in Two Upbuilding Discourses, 1843, and in his Journals (1849). He died not knowing if he had achieved anything at all but he still had faith.If you had loved people then the earnestness of life might have taught you not to be strident but to become silent, and when you were in distress at sea and did not see land, then at least not to involve others in it; it might have taught you to smile at least as long as you believed anyone sought in your face an explanation, a witness. We do not judge you for doubting, because doubt is a crafty passion, and it can certainly be difficult to tear oneself out of its snares. What we require of the doubter that he be silent. What doubt did not make him happy-why then confide to others what will make them just as unhappy. Doubt is a deep and crafty passion. But he whose soul is not gripped by it so inwardly that he becomes speechless is only shamming this passion, therefore what he says is not only false in itself but above all on his lips. The expectancy of faith, then, is victory. The doubt that comes from the outside does not disturb it, since it disgraces itself by speaking. Yet doubt is guileful, on secret paths it sneaks around a person, and when faith is expecting victory, doubt whispers that this expectancy is a deception. An expectancy that without a specified time and place is nothing but a deception; In that way one may always go on waiting; such an expectancy is a circle into which the soul is bewitched and from which it does not escape. In the expectancy of faith, the soul is indeed prevented from falling out of itself, as it were, into multiplicity; it remains in itself, but it would be the worst evil that could befall a person if it escaped from this cycle. 
Søren Kierkegaard, Two Upbuilding Discourses, May 16, 1843When I began as an author of Either/Or, I no doubt had a far more profound impression of the terror of Christianity than any clergyman in the country. I had a fear and trembling such as perhaps no one else had. Not that I therefore wanted to relinquish Christianity. No, I had another interpretation of it. For one thing I had in fact learned very early that there are men who seem to be selected for suffering, and, for another thing, I was conscious of having sinned much and therefore supposed that Christianity had to appear to me in the form of this terror. But how cruel and false of you, I thought, if you use it to terrify others, perhaps upset every so many happy, loving lives that may very well be truly Christian. It was as alien as it could possibly be to my nature to want to terrify others, and therefore I both sadly and perhaps also a bit proudly found my joy in comforting others and in being gentleness itself to them-hiding the terror in my own interior being. So my idea was to give my contemporaries (whether or not they themselves would want to understand) a hint in humorous form (in order to achieve a lighter tone) that a much greater pressure was needed-but then no more; I aimed to keep my heavy burden to myself, as my cross. I have often taken exception to anyone who was a sinner in the strictest sense and then promptly got busy terrifying others. Here is where Concluding Postscript comes in. … 
Søren Kierkegaard, Journal and Papers, VI 6444 (Pap. X1 A541) (1849) (Either/Or Part II, Hong p. 451-452)

External links
 Soren Kierkegaard & Existentialist Philosophy Fear and Trembling Lecture YouTube
 Søren Kierkegaard | The Knight of Faith | Philosophy Core Concepts YouTube
 Søren Kierkegaard | The Knight of Infinite Resignation | Philosophy Core Concepts YouTube

See also
Angst
Übermensch

References

General
Kierkegaard: A Biography by Alastair Hannay.  Cambridge University Press, New edition 2003, . 
Kierkegaard and Fear and Trembling by John Lippit. Routledge 2003,  
Søren Kierkegaard: A Biography by Joakim Garff. Princeton University Press 2005, .

Conceptions of self
Religious philosophical concepts
Christian ethics
Religious belief and doctrine
Søren Kierkegaard